The black-breasted thrush (Turdus dissimilis) is a species of bird in the family Turdidae. It is found from north-eastern India to northern Vietnam. Although both male and female birds have the same colour on their lower parts, the upper section of males is mostly black in colour, while females are mostly grey-brown. Thus, the bird's common name refers to the colour of the male bird's breast. They tend to live in forests located at high altitude.

Taxonomy
The black-breasted thrush belongs to the order Passeriformes and the family Turdidae. The species is a monotypic taxon – it has been hypothesized that it forms part of a larger superspecies, classified together with Tickell's thrush (T. unicolor) and the grey-backed thrush (T. hortulorum). It was previously thought to have conspecificity with the latter species of thrush. The black-breasted thrush was first described by Edward Blyth in 1847 and was found in the lower Bengal region.

Description
Whereas the lower parts are the same colour for both genders, the upper and middle parts are where they differ. For males, the section spanning from their head to the back of their neck and breast area is black, and the remaining areas at the top are slate gray. On the other hand, females are gray-brown from their eyes to their tail, and the section from their throat to their breast is a "diffused" shade of buff.

Distribution and habitat

The bird is found from north-eastern India to northern Vietnam. Their preferred habitats are tropical and subtropical montane forests that are moist. Other suitable habitats that are less important include tropical and subtropical dry forests – for native populations that are resident – as well as tropical/subtropical moist shrubland and mangroves located above the level of high tide.  In southwestern China, these birds can also be found in hilly areas.

The black-breasted thrush has been placed on the Least Concern category of the IUCN Red List, even though its population has been decreasing throughout the last ten years. This is because the reduction in the estimated population is not swift enough to merit Vulnerable status under the IUCN criterion for population trend, which is a decline of more than 30% in ten years or three generations The population decline has been attributed to continuing "destruction and degradation" of the bird's natural habitat.

Behavior
The call of the black-breasted thrush has been described as "sweet mellow" and "melodious", with their musical phrases spanning 3–8 notes. They consume insects, molluscs and berries. The food they gather is usually from the ground, although they occasionally fly to fruit trees. Their time of breeding differs depending on the country in which they are situated. Black-breasted thrushes in India reproduce from April to July; those in Myanmar do so from April to June; in China, these birds mate from May until June.

References

black-breasted thrush
black-breasted thrush
Birds of Northeast India
Birds of Laos
Birds of Myanmar
Birds of Yunnan
black-breasted thrush
Taxonomy articles created by Polbot